Heinz Fricke (11 February 1927 – 7 December 2015) was a German conductor. From 1961 to 1992 he held the position of Generalmusikdirektor of the Staatsoper Unter den Linden in Berlin. He also worked at the Den Norske Opera. In 2010 Fricke announced his retirement after 18 years with the Washington National Opera and the Kennedy Center Opera House Orchestra (he was appointed to both in 1993). He was the honorary Music Director Emeritus of the WNO and the KCOHO.

References

External links
 Washington National Opera Bio

German male conductors (music)
Officers Crosses of the Order of Merit of the Federal Republic of Germany
1927 births
2015 deaths
20th-century German conductors (music)
21st-century German conductors (music)
20th-century German male musicians
21st-century German male musicians